Kavesar is a locality in Thane city of Maharashtra state in India. Kavesar is located about 500 metres from the highway, the Ghodbunder Road and is nearly 7 kilometres from Thane railway station.

Features
It is developing rapidly with all amenities in the vicinity. Many residential complexes including Parkwoods, Regency Towers, Swastik Residency, Vijay Garden, Vijay Vilas, Vijay Vatika, Siddhi, Unnathi Woods, Soham Tropical Lagoon, Sadguru, Rosa Bella, Orion, and Cosmos are situated here.
TMC will be building an 18-acre recreation park in this area. The proposed LRT by TMC will have a separate station for this area and will make the connectivity much better.

Educational Institutes 
 Saraswati School (English Medium - State Board)
 New Horizon Scholars School (English Medium - CBSE Board)
 Arya Cambridge School (English Medium - IGSCE Board)
 Rainbow International Pre-School
 Kidzee Pre-School
 TreeHouse Pre-School
 Muchhala Polytechnic College

References 

Thane